Lisa Rojany (born February 14, 1964) is an American author, editor and publishing executive.

She has written dozens of children's books and was the lead author of Writing Children's Book for Dummies [Wiley, 2005, 2013] – an Amazon Bestseller about the process of writing, promoting, and publishing a book. She also co-wrote (with Julie Stav) the New York Times Bestselling adult nonfiction Fund Your Future [Berkley 2002].

Her 2009 YA nonfiction, Surviving the Angel of Death: The True Story of a Mengele Twin in Auschwitz, co-authored with Eva Kor, was named an American Booksellers Association ABC Best Books for Young Readers in 2017, and has received notoriety from Candles Holocaust Museum, the Jewish Book Council, as well as Archbishop Desmond Tutu, among others.

Her books have been translated to Spanish, German, Polish, Romanian, Chinese, Japanese, French, Italian, and other languages.

Biography 
Lisa Rojany was born on February 14, 1964, in Los Angeles, California, to parents Avi Rojany and Mary Marks. Her father, Avi Rojany, is a stockbroker and real estate magnate who immigrated to the U.S. from Israel in 1962. Her mother, Mary Marks, is an author and reviewer of cozy mysteries for Kensington Publishing Corp.

She has eight half-siblings, all younger – four half-brothers and four half-sisters, and 19 nieces and nephews.

Growing up in Los Angeles, Rojany attended Birmingham High School, and graduated in 1982. After high school, she attended UCLA, where she graduated magna cum laude and Phi Beta Kappa with Honors in 1986, receiving her B.A. in Communication Studies.

In 1986–1987, she studied language abroad in Paris, France, at both La Sorbonne Université and Alliance Française.

She then lived in Providence, Rhode Island, while pursuing her Master's degree from Brown University, graduating with a Master's in English and American Literature in 1991.

Rojany has worked for Price Stern Sloan/Penguin RandomHouse, Golden Books, Americhip Books, Intervisual Books, Gateway Learning Corp (Hooked on Phonics), and MyPotential.com.

She married and divorced Kristian Buccieri (hence the name Rojany-Buccieri on several book authorships), and has three children: Olivia, Chloe, and Genevieve.

She currently lives in Los Angeles. She is the founder and owner of Editorial Services of Los Angeles, the publisher and editor in chief of New York Journal of Books as well as a reviewer, and is listed as a writer for Tanglewood Books. She is a member of the Society of Children's Book Writers and Illustrators, Who's Who of American Women, Who's Who, and the Authors Guild.

Published works

Adult nonfiction 

 Writing Children's Books for Dummies (with Peter Economy) [Wiley, 2005, 2013] [For Dummies; 2 edition, 2012] – ; 
 Fund Your Future (With Julie Stav) [Berkley, 2002] –

Young adult nonfiction 

 Surviving the Angel of Death: The True Story of a Mengele Twin in Auschwitz (with Eva Kor) [Tanglewood; First Trade Paper edition, 2012] – ;

Young adult fiction 

Emergency: in the Emergency Room [Hodder & Stoughton Children's Division, 1997] – ; 
Emergency: Truth or Consequences [Hodder Children's Books, 1997] – ASIN B01F7YB5E8
Emergency Book 4: Staying Alive [Hodder & Stoughton Children's Division, 1997] – ; 
Making the Grade (Code Blue) [HarperCollins, 1997] – ; 
Code Blue: In the Emergency Room [HarperPaperbacks, 1996] – ,

Juvenile fiction/Children's books 

You Can Be a Doctor! (Barbie: You Can Be Series) [MATTEL, INC. and MATTEL EUROPA B.V., 2017] – ASIN B073C2NMXH
Sammy's Suitcase [Random House Children's Books, 2008] – , 
Let's Make Noise Around the House (with Debra Mostow Zakarin) [Silver Dolphin Books, 2007] – ; 
Let's Make Noise at the Airport (with Debra Mostow Zakarin) [Silver Dolphin Books; Ina Ltf Po edition, 2007] – ; 
Let's Make Noise at the Ballpark (with Debra Mostow Zakarin) [Readerlink Distribution Services, LLC, 2007] – , 
Make Your Own Valentine Cards: 16 Cards and 50 Stickers [Golden Books; Gmc Crds edition, 1999] – , 
I Love You Because Love, Barbie (Pop-Up Book) [1998]– ASIN B012YT74BM
Leave It to Beaver [Price Stern Sloan, 1997] – , 
Big Trucks and Bigger Diggers [Price Stern Sloan; 1st edition, 1996] , 
Giant Giants & Magic Mermaid (Giant Fold-out Books) [Price Stern Sloan; 1st edition, 1996] – ; 
Tell Me About When I Was a Baby [Price Stern Sloan; 1st edition, 1996] – ; 
Casper: The Novelization [Mammoth, 1995] – , 
Dena Dinosaur (Fuzzy Friends Board Books) [Penguin Group USA, 1995] – , 
Gold Diggers: the Secret of Bear Mountain [Price Stern Sloan, 1995] – , 
Hippo, Elephant, Whale, Giraffe (Giant Animal Fold-outs) [Price Stern Sloan, 1995] – ; 
Kangaroo and Company (Giant Animal Fold-Outs) [Price Stern Sloan, 1995] – ; 
Melvin Martian (Fuzzy Friends Board Books) [Price Stern Sloan, 1995] – , 
Morty Monster (Fuzzy Friends Board Books) [Price Stern Sloan, 1995] – , 
The Magic Feather: A Jamaican Legend [Troll Associates, 1995] – , 
Wanda Witch (Fuzzy Friends Board Books) [Price Stern Sloan, 1995] – ; 
Birthday [HarperCollins, 1994] – , 
Cats: Those Wonderful Creatures (Little Books) [Andrews McMeel Pub, 1994] – , 
Friendship: What You Mean to Me [Andrews McMeel Publishing, 1994] – , 
Make Your Own Valentines (with Craig Walker) [Penguin Group (USA) Incorporated, 1994] – ,  
Spring Gardens [HarperCollins, 1994] – , 
Token of Love [HarperCollins, 1994] – , 
Walt Disney's Alice in Wonderland: Down the Rabbit Hole [Disney Pr; Ltf edition, 1994] – ; 
Wedding Sentiments (with Ariel Books) [Andrews McMeel Publishing, 1994] – , 
Jake and Jenny on the Town: A Finger Puppet Lift-the-flap Book [Price Stern Sloan, 1993] – , 
King Arthur's Camelot: A Pop-Up Castle and Four Storybooks [Dutton Books for Young Readers; Pop edition, 1993] – ; 
The Story of Hanukkah: A Lift-The-Flap Rebus Book [Hyperion; English Language edition, 1993] – ; 
Where's That Pig? [Price Stern Sloan, 1993] – ; 
Exploring the Human Body [Barron's Juvenile, 1992] – ; 
The Hands-On Book of Big Machines [Little Brown & Co (Juv); 1st edition, 1992] – ASIN B01A6576Z0

References

1964 births
Living people
American editors
American non-fiction children's writers
American women children's writers
American children's writers
Brown University alumni
American publishers (people)
University of California, Los Angeles alumni
21st-century American women